Italy competed at the 1969 European Indoor Games in Belgrade, Yugoslavia, from 8 to 9 March 1969.

Medalists
In this edition of the championships, Italy did not win any medals.

Top eight
Four Italian athletes reached the top eight in this edition of the championships.
Men

Women
In this edition of the championships no women from the Italian national team participated..

See also
 Italy national athletics team

References

External links
 EAA official site 

1969
1969 European Indoor Games
1969 in Italian sport